Nathan Tate Davis (February 15, 1937 – April 8, 2018) was an American jazz multi-instrumentalist who played the tenor saxophone, soprano saxophone, bass clarinet, and flute. He is known for his work with Eric Dolphy, Kenny Clarke, Ray Charles, Slide Hampton and Art Blakey.

Career
Davis traveled extensively around Europe after World War II and moved to Paris in 1962. He held a Ph.D in Ethnomusicology from Wesleyan University and was a professor of music and director of jazz studies at the University of Pittsburgh from 1969, an academic program that he helped initiate. He was also founder and director of the University of Pittsburgh Annual Jazz Seminar and Concert, the first academic jazz event of its kind in the United States. He also helped to found the university's William Robinson Recording Studio as well as establish the International Academy of Jazz Hall of Fame located in the school's William Pitt Union and the University of Pittsburgh-Sonny Rollins International Jazz Archives. Davis retired as director of the Jazz Studies Program at Pitt in 2013. Davis also served as the editor of the International Jazz Archives Journal.

One of Davis' best known musical associations was heading the Paris Reunion Band (1985–1989), which at different times included Nat Adderley, Kenny Drew, Johnny Griffin, Slide Hampton, Joe Henderson, Idris Muhammad, Dizzy Reece, Woody Shaw, and Jimmy Woode.  Davis also toured and recorded with the post-bop ensemble leading Roots which he formed in 1991.

Davis composed various pieces, including a 2004 opera entitled Just Above My Head.

Davis died of natural causes in Palm Beach, Florida, at the age of 81.

Awards and honors
On October 5, 2013, Davis was awarded the Mid-Atlantic Arts Foundation's BNY Mellon Jazz Living Legacy Award at the Kennedy Center for the Performing Arts.

Discography

As leader
1965: The Hip Walk (with Carmell Jones, Francy Boland, Jimmy Woode, Kenny Clarke)
1965: Peace Treaty (with Woody Shaw, Jean-Louis Chautemps, René Urtreger, Jimmy Woode, Kenny Clarke)
1965: Happy Girl  (with Woody Shaw, Larry Young, Jimmy Woode, Billy Lewis Brooks)
1967: The Rules of Freedom (with Hampton Hawes, Jimmy Garrison, Art Taylor)
1969: Jazz Concert in a Benedictine Monastery
1971: Makatuka (with Nelson Harrison, Joe Kennedy, Don Depaotis, Mike Taylor, Virgil Walters, Wheeler Winstead)
1972: 6th Sense in the 11th House (with Roland Hanna, Richard Davis, Alan Dawson)
1976: Suite for Dr. Martin Luther King
1976: If (with Abraham Laboriel, George Caldwell, Dave Palmar, Willie Amoaku)
1982: Faces of Love
1987: London by Night
1996: Nathan Davis
1998: Two Originals: Happy Girl & Hip Walk
1999: I'm a Fool to Want You
2003: Rules of Freedom
2006: Happy Girl
2009: The Best of 1965–76
2019: Live in Paris (The ORTF Recordings 1966–67) (with Georges Arvanitas Trio)

References

External links

 

1937 births
2018 deaths
20th-century African-American musicians
21st-century African-American musicians
Musicians from Kansas City, Kansas
American jazz saxophonists
American male saxophonists
American jazz clarinetists
American jazz flautists
Hard bop musicians
Wesleyan University alumni
University of Pittsburgh faculty
Musicians from Kansas
Musicians from Pittsburgh
Jazz musicians from Pennsylvania
American male jazz musicians
20th-century American saxophonists
20th-century flautists